Cyntech Group provides high-capacity helical pile, helical rigid inclusion and pipeline anchor engineering and manufacturing services for industrial markets.

History
The company was founded in 1981.

In 2010, the company was recognized by Alberta Venture Magazine as one of Alberta's top 25 fastest growing companies over $20 million. Shortly afterward Cyntech was acquired by the North American Construction Group.

In July 2013, Keller Group plc acquired Cyntech Corporation as part of the acquisition of North American Caisson Ltd. (a division of North American Construction Group – NACG). In 2021, Cyntech's helical pile and pipeline anchoring division completed Management Buyout from Keller and became Cyntech Group.

See also
 List of oilfield service companies

References

External links
 

Companies established in 1981
Companies based in Calgary
Oilfield services companies
Engineering companies of Canada